StoryCorps is an American non-profit organization whose mission is to record, preserve, and share the stories of Americans from all backgrounds and beliefs. StoryCorps grew out of Sound Portraits Productions as a project founded in 2003 by radio producer David Isay. Its headquarters are located in the Fort Greene neighborhood of Brooklyn, New York.

StoryCorps is modeled—in spirit and in scope—after the efforts of the Works Progress Administration (WPA) of the 1930s, through which oral history interviews across the United States were recorded. Another inspiration for the organization was oral historian Studs Terkel, who cut the ribbon at the opening of StoryCorps’ first recording booth in Grand Central Terminal. To date, StoryCorps has recorded more than 300,000 interviews among more than 600,000 participants in all 50 states, Washington, D.C., and several American territories.

Interviews
StoryCorps interviews usually take place between two people who know and care about each other. They can be friends, family, or mere acquaintances. A trained StoryCorps facilitator guides participants through the interview process. At the end of each 40-minute recording session, participants receive a complimentary recording of their interview and are requested to make a $50 donation to offset the recording costs. With participant permission, a second copy of each interview is archived at the American Folklife Center at the Library of Congress for future generations to hear. Segments of select interviews may air nationally on NPR’s Morning Edition. These interviews can also be heard on the StoryCorps website.

Recording methods
There are several ways by which participants can record their stories.

StoryBooth
Participants can visit StoryBooths, which are small, publicly accessible recording studios located in public places. The first StoryBooth opened in New York City’s Grand Central Terminal on October 23, 2003, and was moved to Lower Manhattan’s Foley Square in July 2005. The second StoryBooth opened at the Contemporary Jewish Museum in San Francisco in October 2008. The third StoryBooth opened at Atlanta’s public radio station WABE in October 2009. In 2013, StoryCorps opened a fourth StoryBooth at the Chicago Cultural Center. Currently, only the Atlanta StoryBooth is fully operational.

MobileBooth

In May 2005, two StoryCorps MobileBooths built from converted Airstream trailers began traveling the country, recording stories in various cities year-round.

Services
StoryCorps offers three additional recordings services for those who are unable to visit a StoryCorps booth. The Door-to-Door service sends teams of StoryCorps facilitators to temporary recording locations throughout the United States for several days at a time. The StoryKit service ships a professional quality, portable recording device to participants around the country. The “Do-It-Yourself” service allows individuals to download free step-by-step interview instructions, equipment recommendations, and a “Great Question” list to conduct interviews using their own recording equipment.

StoryCorps App 
With the support of the 2015 TED Prize and the 2014 Knight Prototype Fund, StoryCorps has developed a free app that allows users to record interviews on a smartphone. The app helps users prepare questions and provides tips for setting up the right recording environment. Users can upload their interviews to the StoryCorps Online Archive (archive.storycorps.org), and all interviews are archived at the American Folklife Center at the Library of Congress.

Initiatives
StoryCorps collaborates with groups, organizations, and institutions all over the country. Specifically, StoryCorps currently supports the following major initiatives that seek to reach out to the widest range of participants.
The Military Voices Initiative records, shares, and preserves the stories of post-9/11 veterans, active-duty service members, and their families. 
 The Memory Loss Initiative encourages individuals with Alzheimer's disease and other forms of memory loss to share their stories.
 The Historias Initiative collects the stories of Latinos throughout the United States and Puerto Rico.
 The Griot Initiative preserves the voices and experiences of African Americans.  These stories will be archived at the National Museum of African American History and Culture and the American Folklife Center at the Library of Congress.
 The September 11 Initiative honors and remembers the stories of survivors, rescue workers, and others most personally affected by the events of September 11, 2001.
 Stonewall OutLoud seeks to record and preserve a diverse collection of LGBTQ stories across America.
 The Justice Project amplifies and preserves the stories of those whose lives have been impacted by mass incarceration and the criminal justice system.
The Great Thanksgiving Listen encourages people of all ages to create an oral history of our times by recording an interview with an elder, mentor, friend, or someone they admire.
One Small Step, piloted in 2018, is an initiative that brings people with different political views together to record a 50-minute conversation about their lives, not politics, and to get to know each other as human beings.

Community programs 
StoryCorps currently has four community programs.
 Through the MobileBooth Tour, StoryCorps visits cities and towns across the country to record the stories of the people who live there. The MobileBooth Tour partners with local public radio stations, cultural institutions and community-based organizations to get the word out and invite participants to bring someone to the StoryCorps MobileBooth.
 StoryCorps Legacy provides opportunities for people with serious illness, and their relatives, to record and share their life stories. StoryCorps Legacy partners with organizations across the country, including hospitals and clinics, pediatric centers, hospice and palliative care departments, and disease specific organizations.
 StoryCorpsU (SCU) is a year-long, cross-disciplinary (language arts, media, history), youth development program designed for 9th and 10th graders to help students develop self and social awareness, academic skills, and strengthened school relationships. SCU uses StoryCorps’ tested interviewing techniques, combined with outstanding radio broadcasts and animated shorts, to support high school students in the development of identity and in drawing connections between their unique strengths and the college application process. For the 2016–2017 school year, SCU will be implemented in nine schools, more than 30 classrooms, and seven cities. The program was most recently evaluated in 2015 by Dr. Ronald Ferguson, a leading national researcher on racial and economic achievement gaps in education.
 The StoryCorps Archive is the largest born-digital collection of human voices. The collection is housed and can be accessed at the American Folklife Center at the Library of Congress in Washington D.C.

Criticism 
StoryCorps has been criticized on multiple fronts. While it has been called "an oral history of America," one group of oral historians have critiqued the project's methodology, specifically the "highly sculpted techniques of the interviews," such as the pre-scripted questions, the 40-minute time limit, and the presence of a StoryCorps staff member in the recording booth. The result of the technique is that interviews often elicit "an often-rehearsed moment, story, or memory." The oral historians conclude that "the StoryCorps interview is a formula for creating an enduring nugget that can be passed from listener to listener, moving each recipient to give it meaning."

Historians are also critical of the post-interview editing process, which they argue favor highly emotional and predictable narrative arcs. StoryCorps stories typically feature tales of survival, which, as one historian has argued, perpetuates an "interpretive straightjacket of the neoliberal belief that people have their fates in their own hands."

StoryCorps has also been criticized for how its stories are framed on Morning Edition. For example, in a 2016 story, an elderly man confessed to having stolen $2 from his home that had been left for Pearl, his family's domestic servant. When Pearl insisted that she had not been paid that week, she was fired. The title NPR gave the story—"A Lifelong Secret: Can You Help This Ailing 94-Year-Old Man Make Amends?"—as well as Steve Inskeep's closing request for listeners to help find Pearl, drew ire from listeners who found the sympathetic portrayal of the man to be misguided and offensive. One user wrote "waiting nearly a century to try to seek amends is horrific." Another user suggested changing StoryCorps' hashtag from #FindPearl to "FindJUSTICEforPearl." In response to criticism, NPR acknowledged that "the segment comes across, even if this was not the attempt, as trying to manufacture a 'feel good' feature."

Books 
StoryCorps has also published five books:
 Isay, Dave. (2007). Listening Is an Act of Love. (Penguin Press HC.)
 Isay, Dave. (2010). Mom: A Celebration of Mothers from StoryCorps. (Penguin Press HC. )
 Isay, Dave. (2012). All There Is: Love Stories from StoryCorps. (Penguin Press HC. )
 Isay, Dave. (2013). Ties That Bind: Stories of Love and Gratitude from the First Ten Years of StoryCorps. (Penguin Press. )
 Isay, Dave. (2016). Callings: The Purpose and Passion of Work (A StoryCorps Book). (Penguin Press. )

Awards
In 2007, StoryCorps was awarded a rare institutional award at the 66th Annual Peabody Awards. It won another Peabody Award in 2011 for StoryCorps' 9/11 Initiative.

In 2014, the animated special Listening is an Act of Love was nominated for an Annie Award for Best Animated Special Production.

In 2015, Dave Isay won the 2015 TED prize to fulfill his wish for people to have meaningful conversations worldwide using the StoryCorps app.

See also
 National Day of Listening
David Isay

References

External links

 StoryCorps website
 Sound Portraits website
 Feature length radio interview with KGNU Claudia Cragg discussing StoryCorps
 Guide to the StoryCorps Oral Histories about the North Carolina State University Libraries 2017
 David Isay: Everyone around you has a story the world needs to hear at TED

Oral history

Peabody Award-winning websites
Non-profit organizations based in Brooklyn
Fort Greene, Brooklyn
Arts organizations established in 2003
Organizations established in 2003
2003 establishments in New York City
NPR programs
Organizations based in Brooklyn